Plewa is a surname. Notable people with the surname include:

 Emma Plewa (born 1990), Welsh footballer
 John Plewa (1945–1995), American educator and politician
 Konrad Plewa (born 1992), Polish footballer

See also
 

Polish-language surnames